Trio Film is a short lived British production company that operated in the late 1960s.

Select filmography
The Violent Enemy (1967)
The Man Outside (1967)
Amsterdam Affair (1968)
The Limbo Line (1968)
The Vixens (1969)
Taste of Excitement (1969)

References

External links
Trio Films at IMDb
Trio Films at BFI

Film production companies of the United Kingdom